This is a list of airports in California (a U.S. state), grouped by type and sorted by location. It contains all public-use and military airports in the state. Some private-use and former airports may be included where notable, such as airports that were previously public-use, those with commercial enplanements recorded by the FAA or airports assigned an IATA airport code.

Airports

Airport in Mexico with terminal in California
Since 2015, the Tijuana Cross-border Terminal in Otay Mesa gives direct access to Tijuana International Airport, with passengers walking across the U.S.–Mexico border on a footbridge to catch their flight on the Mexican side.

See also 
 California World War II Army Airfields
 Essential Air Service
 List of airports in the Los Angeles area
 List of airports in the San Francisco Bay Area
 List of airports in the San Diego area
 List of airports of Santa Cruz County, California

References 
Federal Aviation Administration (FAA):
 FAA Airport Data (Form 5010) from National Flight Data Center (NFDC), also available from AirportIQ 5010
 National Plan of Integrated Airport Systems (2017–2021), released September 2016
 Passenger Boarding (Enplanement) Data for CY 2019 and 2020, updated November 8, 2021

California Department of Transportation (Caltrans):
 Division of Aeronautics
 Public Use Airports and Federal Airfields Map 2016 
 List of Public Use Airports (Excel spreadsheet)
 Passenger Airports in California 2016 

Other sites used as a reference when compiling and updating this list:
 Aviation Safety Network – used to check IATA airport codes
 Great Circle Mapper: Airports in California – used to check IATA and ICAO airport codes
 Abandoned & Little-Known Airfields: California – used for information on former airports

 
Airports
California